The Piatra Craiului Mountains are a mountain range in the Southern Carpathians in Romania. Its name is translated as Kings' Rock or The Rock of the Prince.

The ridge is regarded as one of the most beautiful sites in the Carpathians. The two-day north–south ridge trail is both challenging and rewarding. Starting at either Plaiul Foii in the north-west or Curmătura in the north-east, walkers climb up to the ridge before following a somewhat precarious path along the narrow spine. The descent at the southern end leads into a karst landscape of deep gorges and pitted slopes where water penetrating the rock has carved a series of caves.

Location 

The massif is bordered in the west by the Dâmbovița Valley which separates it from the Iezer–Păpușa massif; in the north-west the river Bârsa and Curmătura Foii separates it from the Făgăraș Mountains and in the east the Rucăr-Bran Pass delimits it from the Bucegi and Leaotă mountains. The southern border is the confluence of the valleys of Dâmbovița and Dâmbovicioara rivers, in the Podul Dâmboviței depression.

Nature protection

The whole range is included in the national park Parcul Național Piatra Craiului (Piatra Craiului National Park). The first protection of this area started in 1938 when  were declared as a "Nature Reserve". In 2003 the external limits and internal zoning were created. Since 1999 a park administration has existed and since 2005 a management plan has been in place.

In the national park area about 300 fungi species, 220 lichen species, 100 different mosses, 1100 species of superior plants (a third of the number of all plant species found in Romania), 50 Carpathians endemic species and also two endemic species for Piatra Craiului can be found.

There are also two endemic species of spiders, 270 butterfly species, amphibians and reptiles, 110 bird species (50 listed in the Bern Convention and 6 in the Bonn Convention), 17 bat species, chamois and other large herbivores and also many large carnivores (wolves, brown bears, lynx) living in the national park.

Access

Zărnești is the most important town for visiting the national park. It is also an ideal starting point for approaches in the northern part of the massif.

Also, from Zărnești a forest road starts from the south-western part of the town, leading through the Zărnești Gorges (Prăpăstiile) and further up to the ridge.

The traditional villages Măgura, Peștera, Ciocanu, and Șirnea are interesting starting points for the routes on the eastern slope and for getting in touch with the traditional Romanian way of life. Măgura has views towards the Bucegi and Piatra Craiului Mountains.

Activities
One of the most common activities in Piatra Craiului is trekking. "Prăpăstiile Zărneștilor" gorge is one of the most visited sights in the massif. Also because of its tall, steep walls, it is also very suitable for mountain climbing.

In popular culture
 The 2003 movie Cold Mountain, starring Nicole Kidman and Jude Law was shot in Prăpastiile Zărneștiului, a gorge which is the starting point for most trails towards Piatra Craiului.

See also 
 Seven Natural Wonders of Romania

References

External links
 Piatra Craiului National Park homepage

Mountain ranges of Romania
National parks of Romania
Mountain ranges of the Southern Carpathians
Protected areas established in 1938
Ridges of Europe
Geography of Brașov County
Tourist attractions in Brașov County
Zărnești